Edward Devereux, 12th Viscount Hereford (19 February 1741 – 1 August 1783) was an English hereditary peer who sat in the House of Lords as Premier Viscount.

Family
He was the son of Edward Devereux, 11th Viscount Hereford and his wife Catherine Mytton (d. 1748).

Lord Hereford married Henrietta‌‌‌‌ ‌‌‌‌Charlotte‌‌‌‌ Tracy (d. 1817), the daughter of Anthony Keck. Henrietta was born Henrietta Charlotte Keck, but changed her surname to Tracy in 1774 — before her marriage — as a condition of inheriting her uncle Robert Tracy's estate. Edward and Henrietta had no children and the Viscountcy was inherited by Edward's younger brother George Devereux.

See also 
 House of Lords

References

1741 births
1783 deaths
Edward 12
Place of birth unknown
Place of death unknown
Edward